Apache Flats is an unincorporated community in Cole County, in the U.S. state of Missouri.

References

Unincorporated communities in Cole County, Missouri
Unincorporated communities in Missouri
Jefferson City metropolitan area